"It's Alright (Baby's Coming Back)" is a song written and recorded by the British pop music duo Eurythmics. It was released as the fourth and final single from their 1985 album Be Yourself Tonight. The song was produced by Dave Stewart, and the song's brass arrangement was devised by Michael Kamen.

The single became Eurythmics' tenth Top 20 hit in the UK where it peaked at number 12, but was less successful in the United States, stalling at number 78 on the Billboard Hot 100. As songwriters, Annie Lennox and Dave Stewart received the 1986 Ivor Novello award for Best Song Musically and Lyrically.

Composition
The song is a blend of R&B and electronica in the key of Db Major, with a tempo of 93 beats per minute. The intro and chorus repeats the chords Db Major, Cb Major, Gb Major and Fb Major over a bass pedal point of Db, while the bridge remains on Eb minor throughout.

Reception
Cash Box said it "carries on the soul groove of earlier outings."

Track listings
7"
A: "It's Alright (Baby's Coming Back)" (LP Version) - 3:50
B: "Conditioned Soul" (LP Version) - 4:32

12"
A: "It's Alright (Baby's Coming Back)" (LP Version) - 3:50
B1: "Conditioned Soul" (LP Version) - 4:32
B2: "Tous les garçons et les filles"  (Non-LP Track) - 3:29

Music video
The song's music video, directed by Willy Smax, is a combination of live shots and computer animation, an innovative look for a music video in the mid-1980s. The video depicts a story in which Annie Lennox is in a car accident at the beginning of the video and her partner, portrayed by Dave Stewart, is so connected to her that he can instantly tell that something is wrong and immediately travels from the Orient to get to her. She is seen lying in a hospital bed with a heart monitor in the background. She performs the song as an out of body experience. The main focus of the video is Stewart's race to get to Lennox's side, which he finally does by the end of the video. When he opens the door to her hospital room, her eyes instantly pop wide open and the two embrace and then turn into pieces of abstract animation.

Personnel
Eurythmics
 Annie Lennox – vocals, keyboard sequencers
 David A. Stewart – guitars

Additional Personnel
 Dean Garcia – bass guitar
 Olle Romo – drums
 Dave Plews – trumpet
 Martin Dobson – saxophones

Charts

References

External links
YouTube - "It's Alright (Baby's Coming Back)" video

1985 songs
1985 singles
Eurythmics songs
RCA Records singles
Songs written by David A. Stewart
Songs written by Annie Lennox
Song recordings produced by Dave Stewart (musician and producer)